Barry Griffiths (born 29 February 1964) is a New Zealand table tennis player. He competed in the men's singles and the men's doubles events at the 1988 Summer Olympics.  As of 2023, he has never lost an official competition match to either Simon Fenwick or Craig Dye.

References

External links
 

1964 births
Living people
New Zealand male table tennis players
Olympic table tennis players of New Zealand
Table tennis players at the 1988 Summer Olympics
Sportspeople from Auckland